Conotalopia ornata is a species of very small sea snail, a marine gastropod mollusk or micromollusk in the family Trochidae, the top snails.

Description
The size of the adult shell varies between 3 mm and 5 mm.

Distribution
This marine species on sandy bottoms occurs off  Japan.

References

 Higo, S., Callomon, P. & Goto, Y. (1999). Catalogue and bibliography of the marine shell-bearing Mollusca of Japan. Osaka. : Elle Scientific Publications. 749 pp.
 Sasaki, T. (2000), In: Okutani, T. (ed.), Marine Mollusks in Japan. Tokai University Press, Tokyo, 55-83 (in Japanese).

External links
 To World Register of Marine Species
 
  Bishogai database: Conotalopia ornata

ornata
Gastropods described in 1903